Michael Joseph Panetta (born July 14, 1971) is a former District of Columbia shadow representative, having served from 2007 to 2013. Though elected by the citizens of Washington, Panetta was not recognized by Congress. A shadow representative is different from a delegate to Congress, an office held by Eleanor Holmes Norton while Panetta was shadow representative. The office of delegate is created by the U.S. House of Representatives and delegates are recognized by that body.

Political career
Panetta has run several high-profile campaigns for D.C. representation, including starting the District of Columbia Olympic Committee and leading efforts to rebrand RFK Stadium as "Taxation Without Representation Field". Panetta has pledged to make District of Columbia voting rights a national issue that is embraced by progressive activists across the country.

Panetta was reelected in 2008, facing no opposition in the Democratic primary and defeating D.C. Statehood Green Party candidate Joyce Robinson-Paul in the November election by 86 to 13 percent.

Electoral history

References

External links
www.mikepanetta.com

1971 births
Living people
Washington, D.C., Democrats
United States shadow representatives from the District of Columbia
American University alumni